María Clara Rohner (born 1 April 1985) is an Argentine rower. She competed in the women's lightweight double sculls event at the 2012 Summer Olympics.

References

1985 births
Living people
Argentine female rowers
Olympic rowers of Argentina
Rowers at the 2012 Summer Olympics
Sportspeople from Rosario, Santa Fe
Pan American Games medalists in rowing
Pan American Games gold medalists for Argentina
Pan American Games bronze medalists for Argentina
Rowers at the 2011 Pan American Games
Rowers at the 2015 Pan American Games
Medalists at the 2011 Pan American Games
Medalists at the 2015 Pan American Games
21st-century Argentine women